This is a list of schools in Sham Shui Po District, Hong Kong.

Secondary schools

 Government
 Kowloon Technical School (九龍工業學校)

 Aided
 Buddhist Tai Hung College (佛教大雄中學)
 CCC Ming Yin College (中華基督教會銘賢書院)
 Cheung Sha Wan Catholic Secondary School (長沙灣天主教英文中學)
 CMA Secondary School (廠商會中學)
 Concordia Lutheran School (路德會協同中學)
 HK SYC&IA Wong Tai Shan Memorial College (香港四邑商工總會黃棣珊紀念中學)
 Holy Trinity College (寶血會上智英文書院)
 Maryknoll Fathers' School (瑪利諾神父教會學校)
 Nam Wah Catholic Secondary School (天主教南華中學)
 Our Lady of the Rosary College (聖母玫瑰書院)
 PLK Tong Nai Kan Junior Secondary College (保良局唐乃勤初中書院)
 SKH St Mary's Church Mok Hing Yiu College (聖公會聖馬利亞堂莫慶堯中學)
 Tack Ching Girls' Secondary School (德貞女子中學)
 Tak Nga Secondary School (德雅中學)
 TWGH Chang Ming Thien College (東華三院張明添中學)

 Direct Subsidy Scheme
 Chan Shu Kui Memorial School (陳樹渠紀念中學)
 China Holiness College (中聖書院)
 Delia Memorial School (Broadway) (地利亞修女紀念學校﹝百老匯﹞)
 Delia Memorial School (Glee Path) (地利亞修女紀念學校（吉利徑）)
 Heung To Middle School (香島中學)
 St Margaret's Co-educational English Secondary and Primary School (聖瑪加利男女英文中小學)
 Tsung Tsin Christian Academy (基督教崇真中學)
 Wai Kiu College (惠僑英文中學)
 Ying Wa College (英華書院)

 Caput
 United Christian College (滙基書院)

 Private
 Christian Alliance International School (宣道國際學校)
 Concordia International School (協同國際學校)
 Lui Cheung Kwong Lutheran Evening College (路德會呂祥光英文夜中學)
 Po Leung Kuk Choi Kai Yau School (保良局蔡繼有學校)
 Tsung Tsin Middle School (崇正中學)

Primary schools

 Government
 Fuk Wing Street Government Primary School (福榮街官立小學)
 Li Cheng Uk Government Primary School (李鄭屋官立小學)
In 1994 it had significant numbers of students with origins from India and the Philippines.
 Sham Shui Po Government Primary School (深水埗官立小學)

 Aided
 Alliance Primary School, Tai Hang Tung (大坑東宣道小學)
 CCC Heep Woh Primary School (Cheung Sha Wan) (中華基督教會協和小學（長沙灣）)
 Cheung Sha Wan Catholic Primary School (長沙灣天主教小學)
 Five Districts Business Welfare Association School (五邑工商總會學校)
 Good Counsel Catholic Primary School (天主教善導小學)
 HK Sze Yap C&IA San Wui Commercial Society School (香港四邑商工總會新會商會學校)
 Hoi Ping Chamber of Commerce Primary School (旅港開平商會學校)
 Ka Ling School of the Precious Blood (寶血會嘉靈學校)
 Laichikok Catholic Primary School (荔枝角天主教小學)
 Maryknoll Fathers' School (Primary Section) (瑪利諾神父教會學校（小學部）)
 S.K.H. Kei Fook Primary School (聖公會基福小學)
 S.K.H. St. Andrew's Primary School (聖公會聖安德烈小學)
 SKH Kei Oi Primary School (聖公會基愛小學)
 SKH St Clement's Primary School (聖公會聖紀文小學)
 SKH St Thomas' Primary School (聖公會聖多馬小學)
 Shamshuipo Kaifong Welfare Association Primary School (深水埔街坊福利會小學)
 St Francis of Assisi's Caritas School (聖方濟愛德小學)
 The ELCHK Faith Lutheran School (基督教香港信義會深信學校)

 Direct Subsidy Scheme
 Lingnan University Alumni Association (Hong Kong) Primary School (嶺南大學香港同學會小學)
 St Margaret's Co-educational English Secondary & Primary School 
 Ying Wa Primary School (英華小學)

 Private
 Bloom KKCA Academy (百卉九江書院)
 Chan's Creative School (啓基學校
 Christian Alliance International School (宣道國際學校)
 Delia English Primary School and Kindergarten) (地利亞英文小學暨幼稚園)
 Kowloon Rhenish School (九龍禮賢學校)
 Po Leung Kuk Choi Kai Yau School (保良局蔡繼有學校)
 San Wui Commercial Society of YMCA Hong Kong Christian School (新會商會港青基信學校)
 St Francis of Assisi's English Primary School (聖方濟各英文小學)
 Tak Nga Primary School (德雅小學)
 Tsung Tsin Primary School and Kindergarten (崇真小學暨幼稚園)

Special schools
 Aided
 Caritas Jockey Club Lok Yan School (明愛賽馬會樂仁學校)
 CCC Mongkok Church Kai Oi School (中華基督教會望覺堂啟愛學校)
 Hong Kong Red Cross Hospital Schools Caritas Medical Centre (香港紅十字會醫院學校)
 Hong Kong Red Cross Hospital Schools Princess Margaret Hospital (香港紅十字會醫院學校)
 Mental Health Association of Hong Kong - Cornwall School (香港心理衞生會－臻和學校)
 Saviour Lutheran School (路德會救主學校)
 The Society of Boys' Centres Hui Chung Sing Memorial School (香港扶幼會－許仲繩紀念學校)
 The Society of Boys' Centres Chak Yan Centre School (香港扶幼會則仁中心學校
 TWGH Kwan Fong Kai Chi School (東華三院群芳啓智學校)

References

Lists of schools in Hong Kong
Sham Shui Po District